St Andrew's Church is a joint Anglican and Methodist church in Paddock Wood, Kent, England.

Building 
The building is built in a post-war brick style, although the design echoes some features of earlier gothic Anglican churches. The rose window at the west end, was designed by Joan Howson in memory of former Paddock Wood resident, John Brunt VC. The northern end of the church complex houses a Fairtrade shop.

History 
The original St Andrew's Church was opened on 28 October 1851. The street next to its former site is still called "Church Road", and the graveyard is extant, known as the "Old Churchyard". The church was severely damaged during WW2, as a German bomber hit it directly on the night of 4 November 1940, causing the roof to collapse. It was later demolished.

The current church was built in the 1950s, on a different site further south. Certain elements of the original church were salvaged and reused for the current building.

See also 
 List of places of worship in Tunbridge Wells (borough)

References 

Church of England church buildings in Kent
Methodist churches in Kent